Peter Francis Cockburn FRPSL (born January 1946) is the president of the Royal Philatelic Society London. He is a leading revenue philatelist whose collection of stamps and covers of South East Asia was sold by Spink in Singapore in 2014. He also collects the postage stamps of the BMA period of Malaya.

He came up to University College, Oxford, to study for a degree in plant sciences in 1964.

References

External links 

Living people
British philatelists
Presidents of the Royal Philatelic Society London
1946 births
Fellows of the Royal Philatelic Society London
People educated at Brighton College
Alumni of University College, Oxford